James Walker Log House is a historic log house in Brenham, Texas.

It was built in 1824 and added to the National Register of Historic Places in 1989.

See also

National Register of Historic Places listings in Washington County, Texas
Recorded Texas Historic Landmarks in Washington County

References

Houses on the National Register of Historic Places in Texas
National Register of Historic Places in Washington County, Texas
Houses completed in 1824
Houses in Washington County, Texas
Buildings and structures in Brenham, Texas
Log cabins in the United States
Log buildings and structures on the National Register of Historic Places in Texas
Recorded Texas Historic Landmarks